Sir John Stuart Macpherson, GCMG (25 August 1898 – 5 November 1971) was a British colonial administrator who served as the Governor-General of Nigeria from 1948 to 1955.

Early life 
Born in Edinburgh, the son of a hotel manager, Macpherson was educated at George Watson's College and at the University of Edinburgh. In 1917, he was commissioned into the Argyll and Sutherland Highlanders; he was wounded in action on the Western Front, and had to wear a steel corset for the rest of his life.

Career 
After World War I, Macpherson entered the Malayan Civil Service. Between 1933 and 1935 he was seconded to the Colonial Office. He was appointed Principal Assistant Secretary in Nigeria in 1937 and Chief Secretary of Palestine in 1939, serving there until 1943. In 1943 he was posted to Washington as Head of British Colonies Supply Mission and joint British Chairman of Anglo-American Caribbean Commission. Between 1945 and 1948 he was Comptroller for Development and Welfare in the West Indies and British co-Chairman of the Caribbean Commission.

In 1948, Macpherson was appointed Governor of Nigeria (Governor-General from 1954), serving in that post until his retirement in 1955; he was succeeded by James Wilson Robertson. As Governor, Macpherson was responsible for the introduction of the 1951 Constitution (unofficially known as the Macpherson Constitution), which provided for "semi-responsible government". He also accelerated the Africanization of the Nigerian public service.

After his governorship, Macpherson served as the Chairman of the United Nations Visiting Mission to Trust Territories of the Pacific in 1956. The same year, he was appointed Permanent Under-Secretary of State for the Colonies, serving until 1959.

Honours 
Macpherson was appointed CMG in 1941, promoted to KCMG in 1945 and GCMG in 1951. On 2 July 1947 he was made an Officer of the Czechoslovak Order of the White Lion.

References

External links 

 

1898 births
1971 deaths
British Governors and Governors-General of Nigeria
Alumni of the University of Edinburgh
Argyll and Sutherland Highlanders officers
British Army personnel of World War I
Colonial Service officers
Civil servants in the Colonial Office
Permanent Under-Secretaries of State for the Colonies
Knights Grand Cross of the Order of St Michael and St George
Officers of the Order of the White Lion
Chief Secretaries of Palestine